Anthony Joseph Accardo (born Antonino Leonardo Accardo, ; April 28, 1906 – May 22, 1992), also known as "Joe Batters" and "Big Tuna", was an American longtime mobster. In a criminal career that spanned eight decades, he rose from small-time hoodlum to the position of day-to-day boss of the Chicago Outfit in 1947, to ultimately becoming the final Outfit authority in 1972. Accardo moved the Outfit into new operations and territories, greatly increasing its power and wealth during his tenure as boss.

Early life
Accardo was born on April 28, 1906, in Chicago's Near West Side, the second of six children of shoemaker Francesco Accardo and Maria Tilotta Accardo. One year prior to his birth, the Accardos had emigrated from Castelvetrano, in the Province of Trapani, Sicily, Italy to America. At age 14, Accardo left school and started loitering around neighborhood pool halls. He soon joined the Circus Cafe Gang, run by Claude Maddox and Tony Capezio, one of many street gangs in the poor neighborhoods of Chicago. These gangs served as talent pools (similar to the concept of farm teams) for the city's adult criminal organizations. Jack "Machine Gun" McGurn, one of the toughest hitmen of Chicago Outfit boss Al Capone, recruited Accardo into his crew, along with long time associate Tony Mazlack of Gary, Indiana.

Career

Capone regime
During Prohibition, Accardo got the nickname "Joe Batters" after using a baseball bat to murder three mobsters who had betrayed the Outfit. Capone was allegedly quoted as saying, "Boy, this kid's a real Joe Batters". Chicago newspapers eventually dubbed Accardo "The Big Tuna", after a fishing expedition where Accardo caught a giant tuna and was famously photographed with his catch. In later years, Accardo boasted over federal wiretaps that he participated in the infamous 1929 St. Valentine's Day Massacre in which, allegedly, Capone gunmen murdered seven members of rival Bugs Moran's North Side Gang. Accardo also claimed that he was one of the gunmen who murdered Brooklyn gang boss Frankie Yale, again by Capone's orders to settle a dispute. However, most experts believe Accardo had only peripheral connections, if any, with the St. Valentine's Day Massacre and none whatsoever with the Yale murder, which was most likely committed by Gus Winkler, Fred Burke, and Louis Campagna. However, on October 11, 1926, Accardo may have participated in the assassination of Northside gang leader Hymie Weiss near the Holy Name Cathedral in Chicago.

In 1932, Capone was convicted of tax evasion and sent to prison for an 11-year sentence, and Frank "The Enforcer" Nitti became the new Outfit boss after serving his own 18-month sentence for tax evasion. By this time, Accardo had established a solid record making money for the organization, so Nitti let him establish his own crew. He was also named as the Outfit's head of enforcement. Accardo soon developed a variety of profitable rackets, including gambling, loansharking, bookmaking, extortion, and the distribution of untaxed alcohol and cigarettes. As with all caporegimes, Accardo received 5% of the crew's earnings as a so-called "street tax". Accardo, in turn, paid a tax to the boss of the Outfit. If a crew member were to refuse to pay a street tax (or paid less than half of the amount owed), they would be killed. Accardo's crew included future Outfit heavyweights Gus "Gussie" Alex and Joseph "Joey Doves" Aiuppa.

Chicago boss
In the 1940s, Accardo continued to gain power in the Outfit. As the decade progressed, senior members of the Outfit were investigated and charged with using the threat of strike action by the labor unions they controlled to extort millions of dollars from Hollywood studios. Nitti, who was claustrophobic and fearful of serving a second prison term, committed suicide in 1943. Paul "The Waiter" Ricca, who had been the de facto boss since Capone's imprisonment, took the role officially and named Accardo as underboss. Ricca and Accardo would run the Outfit for the next 30 years until Ricca's death in 1972. When Ricca subsequently received a 10-year prison sentence for his part in the Hollywood scandal, Accardo became acting boss. Three years later, when Ricca was barred from contact with mobsters as a condition for his parole, Accardo then became boss of the Outfit; in practice, he shared power with Ricca, who remained in the background as a senior consultant.

Under Accardo's leadership in the late 1940s, the Outfit moved into slot and vending machines, counterfeiting cigarette and liquor tax stamps, and expanding narcotics smuggling. Accardo placed slot machines in gas stations, restaurants and bars throughout the Outfit's territory. Outside of Chicago, the Outfit expanded into Las Vegas and took influence over gaming away from the Five Families of New York City. Accardo made sure that all the legal Las Vegas casinos used his slot machines. In Kansas and Oklahoma, he took advantage of the official ban on alcohol sales to introduce bootlegged alcohol. The Outfit eventually dominated organized crime in most of the western United States. To reduce the Outfit's exposure to legal prosecution, Accardo phased out some traditional activities such as labor racketeering and extortion. He also converted the Outfit's brothel business into call girl services. The result of these changes was a golden era of profitability and influence for the Outfit.

Accardo and Ricca emphasized keeping a low profile and let flashier figures, such as Sam Giancana, attract attention instead. For example, when professional wrestlers Lou Albano and Tony Altomare, wrestling as a Mafia-inspired tag team called "The Sicilians", came to Chicago in 1961, Accardo persuaded the men to drop the gimmick to avoid any mob-related publicity. By using tactics such as these, Accardo and Ricca were able to run the Outfit much longer than Capone. Ricca once said, "Accardo had more brains for breakfast than Capone had in a lifetime".

Change of leadership
After 1957, Accardo turned over the official position as boss to Giancana, because of "heat" from the IRS. Accardo then became the Outfit's consigliere, stepping away from the day-to-day running of the organization, but he still retained considerable power and demanded ultimate respect. Giancana still had to obtain the sanction of Accardo and Ricca on major business, including murders.

However, this working relationship eventually broke down. Unlike Accardo, the widowed Giancana lived an ostentatious lifestyle, frequenting posh nightclubs and dating high-profile singer Phyllis McGuire. Giancana also refused to distribute some of the lavish profits from Outfit casinos in Iran and Central America to the rank-and-file members. Many in the Outfit also felt that Giancana was attracting too much attention from the FBI, which was forever tailing his car around the Chicago metropolitan area. Around 1966, after spending a year in jail on federal contempt of court charges, Accardo and Ricca replaced Giancana with Aiuppa. In June 1975, after spending most of his Outfit-exile years in Mexico and unceremoniously being booted from that country, Giancana was murdered in the basement apartment of his home, in Oak Park, Illinois, while cooking Italian sausages and escarole.

Ricca died in 1972, leaving Accardo as the ultimate authority in the Outfit.

The burglary
In 1978, while Accardo vacationed in California, burglars entered his River Forest home.
Shortly afterwards, the three suspected thieves and four related persons were found strangled and with their throats cut. Law enforcement officials believed Accardo had ordered the killings in retaliation for the burglary. In 2002, this theory was confirmed on the witness stand by Outfit turncoat Nicholas Calabrese, who had participated in all of the murders. The surviving assassins were all convicted in the Family Secrets trial, and sentenced to long prison terms.

Personal life
In 1934, Accardo met Clarice Pordzany, a Polish-American chorus girl. They later married and had two daughters, Marie Judith and Linda Lee, and adopted two sons, Joseph Frank and Anthony Ross.

Several of Accardo's family members have had careers in the National Football League. His daughter Marie married Palmer Pyle, who played guard for the Baltimore Colts, Minnesota Vikings, and Oakland Raiders. Their son Eric Kumerow played linebacker for the Miami Dolphins, and Eric's son Jake currently plays wide receiver for the Buffalo Bills. Eric's sister Cheryl married John Bosa, who played defensive end for the Dolphins. They have two sons, Joey and Nick, both of whom also currently play defensive end: Joey for the Los Angeles Chargers, and Nick for the San Francisco 49ers.

For most of his married life, Accardo lived in River Forest, Illinois. The six-bedroom, six-bath home he owned on Franklin Avenue in River Forest contained two bowling lanes, an indoor swimming pool and a pipe organ. When he started receiving attention from the IRS about his apparent high lifestyle, he bought a ranch home on the 1400 block of North Ashland Avenue, in River Forest, and installed a vault. His neighbor and friend Dr. Jim Carto lived across the street off Ashland Ave in the Mars Candy Mansion and was rumored to have assisted in providing medical care. Due to their similar sounding last names, Dr. Carto was often confused with Accardo and became respected as a member of the Accardo family. Dr. Carto and his wife Rose (née Kolanko) who was a nurse, Dr. Leon Kolanko (Rose's brother) were rumored as Accardo's personal physicians who may have helped assist in medical care "off the books."   Accardo's official job was that of a beer salesman for a Chicago brewery.

Death and burial
In the late 1970s, Accardo bought a home in Palm Springs, California, flying to Chicago to preside over Outfit "sit-downs" and mediate disputes. By this time, his personal holdings included legal investments in commercial office buildings, retail centers, lumber farms, paper factories, hotels, car dealerships, trucking companies, newspaper companies, restaurants and travel agencies.

Accardo spent his last years in Barrington Hills, Illinois living with his daughter and son-in-law. On May 22, 1992, Anthony Accardo died of respiratory and heart conditions at age 86. Accardo is buried in a crypt in the mausoleum at Queen of Heaven Cemetery, in Hillside, Illinois. Despite an arrest record dating back to 1922, Accardo spent only one night in jail or avoided the inside of a cell entirely (depending on the source).

In popular culture
In the 1995 television movie Sugartime about Giancana and McGuire, Accardo is portrayed by Maury Chaykin.
In the television series Vegas, Accardo is simply referred to as "Tuna" by mobster Vincent Savino when he is preparing the monthly casino skim to depart to Chicago.
In the 2016 AMC mini series “The Making of the Mob: Chicago” Accardo is portrayed by actor Jason Fitch

See also
List of Havana Conference invitees

Notes

References

External links

LIUNA – Tony Accardo Obituary  22

 

1906 births
1992 deaths
Al Capone associates
American crime bosses
American gangsters of Sicilian descent
Burials in Illinois
Chicago Outfit bosses
Chicago Outfit mobsters
Consiglieri
People from Barrington Hills, Illinois
People from Chicago
People from Palm Springs, California
People from River Forest, Illinois
Prohibition-era gangsters